Kor-e Sofla (also Romanized as Kor-e Soflá; also known as Kowr-e Pā'īn and Kūr) is a village in Peyghan Chayi Rural District, in the Central District of Kaleybar County, East Azerbaijan Province, Iran. At the 2006 census, its population was 31, in 7 families.

References 

Populated places in Kaleybar County